Air Odisha was an Indian regional airline based in Bhubaneswar, Odisha incorporated on 25 Jan, 2011 as Air Odisha Aviation Pvt. Ltd. It operated daily flights to numerous destinations across India, according to the Regional Connectivity Scheme. The airline officially had its base at Biju Patnaik International Airport with an additional operation base at Sardar Vallabhbhai Patel International Airport. It has since suspended operations.

History
Air Odisha Aviation Private Limited (AOAPL) was formed under Companies Act, Government of Odisha to provide air charter service. It is one of the regional scheduled airlines of India. The airline received its license to commence scheduled operations on 13 February 2018, i.e. valid up to 12 February 2021.

In February 2018, 60% of Air Odisha's stake was sold to GSEC Monarch Aviation, an Adani Group enterprise.

Fleet

As of April 2018, the Air Odisha fleet consisted of the following aircraft:

References

External links
 Official website

Defunct airlines of India
Indian companies established in 2011
Airlines established in 2011
Companies based in Odisha
2011 establishments in Odisha